Yasim Murtaza (born 4 December 1990) is a Pakistani cricketer who played in first-class matches for Rawalpindi cricket team. Between 2006 and 2016, Murtaza played in 74 first-class, 59 List A, and 33 Twenty20 matches in Pakistan.

After completing a period of residency, Murtaza became eligible to represent the Hong Kong cricket team. In May 2022, he was named in Hong Kong's side for the 2022 Uganda Cricket World Cup Challenge League B tournament. He made his T20I debut on 11 July 2022, for Hong Kong against Uganda.

References

External links
 

1990 births
Living people
Pakistani cricketers
Hong Kong cricketers
Hong Kong Twenty20 International cricketers
Rawalpindi cricketers
Cricketers from Sialkot
United Bank Limited cricketers